British Columbia Highway 118, also known as the Central Babine Lake Highway and signed as Topley Landing Road, is a 50 km (31 mi) long minor spur of the Yellowhead Highway in the Regional District of Bulkley-Nechako.

Signed as such in 2003, Highway 118 is the highest numbered highway in the province not derived from the continuation of a US highway.  The lightly used highway provides a connection from the Yellowhead at the community of Topley north to the village of Granisle.

External links
 Highway Routes in British Columbia

References

118